Polyscias elegans, known as the celery wood, is a rainforest tree of eastern Australia. It occurs in a variety of different rainforest types, from fertile basaltic soils, to sand dunes and less fertile sedimentary soils. The range of natural distribution is from Jervis Bay (35° S) in southern New South Wales to Thursday Island (10° S), north of the Australian continent. Other common names include black pencil cedar and silver basswood. Polyscias elegans is useful to bush regenerators as a nursery tree, which provides shade for longer-lived young trees underneath. Polyscias elegans is also known as Celery wood, Mowbulan whitewood, Silver basswood and White sycamore.

Description 

It is a fast-growing medium-sized tree with an attractive palm-like or umbrella-shaped crown. Up to 30 meters tall and a trunk diameter of 75 cm. The trunk is mostly straight, unbuttressed and cylindrical, smooth-barked on young trees but fissured, scaly and rough-barked on larger trees.

Leaves are large, pinnate or bi-pinnate with almost opposite leaflets, often in threes. Leaflets ovate in shape, with a point, 5 to 13 cm long. Leaf veins noticeable on both sides, net veins visible below.

Purple flowers form on a terminal panicle, arranged in a series of racemes in the months of February to April. However, flowers can form at other times. The fruit is a drupe; brown or purplish black in colour, 5 to 7 mm wide. Inside the drupe are two cells, containing one seed each, 5 mm long. Seed is fertile for regeneration from the droppings of the pied currawong.

The fruit is eaten by a large variety of birds, including brown cuckoo dove, Australasian figbird, green catbird, Lewin's honeyeater, olive-backed oriole, pied currawong, paradise riflebird, rose crowned fruit dove, silvereye, superb fruit dove, topknot pigeon and wompoo fruit dove.

References 

  (other publication details, included in citation)
 Polyscias elegans at NSW Flora Online Retrieved 20 June 2009

elegans
Apiales of Australia
Trees of Australia
Flora of New South Wales
Flora of Queensland
Plants described in 1894
Taxa named by Ferdinand von Mueller
Taxa named by Charles Moore